George Cameron (August 17, 1881 – November 1968) was a British-born American cyclist. He competed in three events at the 1908 Summer Olympics.

References

External links
 

1881 births
1968 deaths
American male cyclists
Olympic cyclists of the United States
Cyclists at the 1908 Summer Olympics
Cyclists from Glasgow